Oxadiazoles are a class of heterocyclic aromatic chemical compound of the azole family; with the molecular formula C2H2N2O. There are four isomers of oxadiazole:

1,2,4-Oxadiazole, 1,2,5-oxadiazole, and 1,3,4-oxadiazole are all known and appear in a variety of pharmaceutical drugs including raltegravir, butalamine, fasiplon, oxolamine, and pleconaril. 
The 1,2,3-isomer is unstable and ring-opens to form the diazoketone tautomer; however, it does exist within the unusual sydnone motif.

In 2018, a compound called bis(1,2,4-oxadiazole)bis(methylene) dinitrate which might have a 1.5 times the power of TNT was developed at the United States Army Research Laboratory (ARL) working with the Los Alamos National Laboratory.

References